is a retired Japanese rally driver, having been on the podium seven times at the Dakar Rally in the trucks category.

He has competed in 36 Dakar Rally competitions as of the 2019 edition, which he participated in at the age of 77. In 2017 he was mentioned in Guinness World Records for racing the most consecutive Dakar Rallies. His entry has since been updated to reflect his current record of 36.

Dakar Rally results

References

External links
 HINO Team SUGAWARA

1941 births
Living people
Japanese rally drivers
Off-road racing drivers
Dakar Rally drivers
Rally raid truck drivers